George Everts was a member of the Wisconsin State Assembly in 1883. He was later an unsuccessful candidate for the Assembly in 1888, losing to Benjamin Charles Garside. Additionally, he had been town clerk of Granville, Wisconsin and a county supervisor of Milwaukee County, Wisconsin. He was a Democrat. Everts was born on August 8, 1842 in Granville.

References

People from Granville, Wisconsin
County supervisors in Wisconsin
City and town clerks
1842 births
Year of death missing
Democratic Party members of the Wisconsin State Assembly